Sączów  is a village in the administrative district of Gmina Bobrowniki, within Będzin, Silesian Voivodeship, in southern Poland.

The village has a population of 1,406.

References

Gmina Bobrowniki